Sujja Siriket is a Thai former football sweeper who played for Thailand in the 1996 Asian Cup. He is a former captain of the Thai Farmers Bank FC.

Honours
Thai Farmer Bank FC
 AFC Champions League: 1994, 1995
 Thai League T1 (Kor Royal Cup): 1991, 1992, 1993, 1995, 2000
 Queen's Cup: 1994, 1995, 1996, 1997
 Afro-Asian Club Championship: 1994
 Thailand FA Cup: 1999

International goals

External links

Year of birth missing (living people)
Living people
Sujja Siriket
Sujja Siriket
1996 AFC Asian Cup players
Association football defenders